Iuliia Vladimirovna Kaplina (born 11 May 1993) is a Russian sport climber who has won multiple speed climbing events and set multiple world records. She was the world record holder in women's speed climbing until 6 August 2021, setting the record at the 2020 European Championships in Moscow (6.964).

Her first participation in World Cup was in 2012 in Chamonix where she ranked 18th. Her performance at the IFSC Combined Qualifier Toulouse 2019 qualified her for a spot in the 2020 Summer Olympics. There, she did not qualify for the final after failing to push the button at the top of the wall in her second try, leaving her with her initial time of 7.65 at the end, which was not enough to stay in the top 10 until the end of the qualification, as she did not show good enough results in the lead and bouldering events. In an interview with Sport-Express she stated that the Russians did not know about the opportunity to do test climbs before the actual qualification climbs; the organizers forbade test climbs for speed climbers during the qualification event. She explained that test climbs are important to understand the friction of the holds and the climate of the surroundings.

Rankings

Climbing World Cup

Climbing World Championships 
Youth

Adult

Number of medals in the Climbing World Cup

Speed

References

External links 

 
 
 
 

Living people
1993 births
Female climbers
Russian rock climbers
Competitors at the 2013 World Games
Competitors at the 2017 World Games
World Games gold medalists
Sport climbers at the 2020 Summer Olympics
20th-century Russian women
21st-century Russian women
IFSC Climbing World Championships medalists
IFSC Climbing World Cup overall medalists
Speed climbers